The Scottish Junior Football Association, North Region  is one of the two regions of the Scottish Junior Football Association. Its area covers Grampian and Moray as well as part of the Highland and Angus council areas – from Montrose in the south to Nairn in the west. The North Region features three region-wide divisions, having reverted from the previous setup of two regional divisions below the North Superleague used for five seasons prior to 2018. It replaced the North Junior Football League (1968 to 2001) which had a similar territory and structure. On 5 July 2021, it was announced that the North Region leagues are joined from tier 6 by the North Caledonian League and Midlands League to form a fully-integrated lower tiers below the Highland League from 2021-22.

Member clubs
There are 33 member clubs of North Region. Buckie Rovers and Spey Valley United are in abeyance for 2021-22.

North Superleague

North First Division

North Second Division

Cup competitions
There are seven cup competitions in the North Region:
 The Jim McPherson Trophy This is a pre-season charity match, similar to the FA Community Shield, played between the previous seasons North Superleague champions and North Regional Cup winners. First played for in 2015, it is named after the late Assistant Secretary and Treasurer of the North Region.
 The North Regional Cup. Known as the Domino's Pizza North Regional Cup under a sponsorship arrangement, this is a knockout tournament for all North Region clubs.
 Grill League Cup. This is the opening tournament of the season. Clubs are drawn in eight groups with the group winners advancing to a knockout competition.
McLeman Cup. Known as the PMAC Group McLeman Cup under a sponsorship arrangement, this is a knockout tournament for clubs in the North Superleague.
Morrison Cup. Known as the AM Property Maintenance Morrison Cup under a sponsorship arrangement, this is a knockout tournament for clubs in the North First Division (East).
Elginshire Cup. This is a tournament for clubs in the North First Division (West). Clubs are drawn in two groups with winners and runners-up advancing to the semi-final stage.
 North and Tayside Inter-Regional Cup. Known as the Signature Signs Cup for sponsorship purposes, this is a knockout tournament involving North Region clubs and Midlands League clubs. First played for in 1988, the cup is administered by a joint committee and clubs play early rounds in their own region with eight sides from each area progressing to the last sixteen.

Inactive
 The Archibald Cup This was added for North First Division (West) clubs in 2015–16 to bolster their fixture programme after the withdrawal of clubs from the league. The tournament is played in two groups with winners and runners-up progressing to the semi-finals.

Holders
 Jim McPherson Trophy - Banks O' Dee (2017–18 competition)
 North Regional Cup - East End (2021–22 competition)
 Grill League Cup - Culter (2022-23 competition)
 McLeman Cup - Banks O' Dee (2021-22 competition)
 Morrison Cup - Banchory St Ternan (2018-19 competition)
 Elginshire Cup - Dufftown (2021-22 competition)
 Inter-Regional Cup - East Craigie (2021-22 competition)

Roll of Honour

References

External links
 The North Region Scottish Junior Football Association
 Stewart Davidson, Scottish Non-League Review, issues 15–24.

 
Football in Aberdeen
Football in Aberdeenshire
Football in Highland (council area)
Football in Moray